Darron Varnell Thomas (born May 23, 1990) is a former American football quarterback. He was the starting quarterback for the University of Oregon football team that reached the 2011 BCS National Championship Game and won the 2012 Rose Bowl.

Early life
Thomas was born in Houston, Texas on May 23, 1990 to Latina Thomas and Darren Waters. Thomas attended Aldine High School in Aldine, Texas. As a freshman at Aldine, Thomas played as a running back. During summer practice before Thomas' sophomore year, Aldine head coach, Bob Jones, had the idea of switching Thomas to quarterback to run his spread offense. Thomas was opposed to the switch, but made it anyway. During his senior season, Thomas verbally committed to Louisiana State University. When the LSU recruiting class for quarterbacks became 3 members, Thomas de-committed.

Thomas committed to the University of Oregon on December 14, 2007, choosing Oregon over scholarships from Florida, LSU, Miami (FL), Minnesota, Missouri, Nebraska, and Oklahoma State.

College career

Thomas completed his career at Oregon with a 24–3 record as a starter, leading the Ducks to two consecutive Pac-12 Championships, including appearances in two BCS Bowl games.

Just months removed from Aldine High in Houston, Thomas came off the bench as a true freshman to lead a stirring second-half rally against Boise State in his first collegiate game. Thomas tossed three touchdown passes in the fourth quarter to rally Oregon from a 24-point deficit. The Ducks lost to Boise State 32–27 but his unexpected debut and impressive performance led many fans to believe he would be the true successor to Dennis Dixon, however, he would continue to backup Jeremiah Masoli for the remainder of the 2008 season.

After redshirting the 2009 season, Thomas became the starting quarterback for the Ducks in 2010 after previous starter Jeremiah Masoli was suspended for the 2010 season and eventually dismissed from the team.

2011 BCS National Championship

In his first season as a starter, Thomas threw for 2,881 yards and 30 touchdowns, leading Oregon to a 12–0 regular season record, and an appearance in the 2011 BCS National Championship Game against Auburn. In that game, Thomas threw for 363 yards and two touchdowns, but also threw two interceptions. Auburn would ultimately go on to win 22–19, with a last-second field goal. After the season, Thomas was named as a 2nd Team All-Pac-10 Conference selection at quarterback and the co-recipient of the Skeie’s Award as the team’s most outstanding player.

2012 Rose Bowl

During the 2011 season, Thomas threw for 2,761 yards, and a single season school record of 33 touchdowns, leading the Ducks to the 2012 Rose Bowl, in which Thomas threw for 268 yards and 3 touchdowns to propel Oregon to a 45–38 victory over Wisconsin. The Ducks finished the season 12–2 (8–1 Pac-12) with a #4 final season ranking.

Statistics

Professional career
At the end of his junior season, Thomas surprisingly chose to forgo his senior year to enter the 2012 NFL Draft but was neither drafted nor signed as an undrafted free agent by any NFL team. He was rated the 17th best quarterback in the 2012 Draft by NFLDraftScout.com.

Calgary Stampeders
On October 9, 2012, Thomas signed a practice roster agreement with the Calgary Stampeders of the Canadian Football League.

Lincoln Haymakers

He would later sign with the Lincoln Haymakers of the Champions Professional Indoor Football League but never played a game for the Haymakers.

Portland Thunder/Steel

Thomas was assigned to the Portland Thunder of the Arena Football League on October 10, 2013. Thomas fits in with the ownership's promise of getting players with Oregon ties. Thomas started the first three games of the season for the Thunder before being benched in favor of Danny Southwick. Thomas became the primary back up for the Thunder since losing his starting position. Entering his second season with the Thunder in 2015, Thomas was once again the backup quarterback to Kyle Rowley.

Thomas participated in the NFL's first Veteran Combine in March 2015. On January 27, 2016, he was named head coach Chris Miller's franchise player in Major League Football. The team was to be called the Oregon Crash but the season never started.

Thomas was assigned to the Portland Steel on April 25, 2016. He made his only start of the season on May 10, 2016, against the Los Angeles Kiss, completing 25 of 49 passes for 259 yards, 3 touchdowns and 5 interceptions in a 66–27 loss.

Arizona Rattlers
On October 28, 2016, Thomas signed with the Arizona Rattlers, who joined the Indoor Football League a week prior. Thomas played in 5 games for the Rattlers in 2017, completing 54 of 93 passes for 576 yards, 13 touchdowns and 4 interceptions. He also scored four rushing touchdowns. On July 8, the Rattlers defeated the Sioux Falls Storm in the United Bowl by a score of 50–41.

Cedar Rapids Titans
On February 5, 2018, AZ Central Sports columnist Richard Obert reported that Thomas was traded to the Cedar Rapids Titans in exchange for local Arizona product Jordan Gehrke. Thomas was released by the Titans on February 21, 2018.

Massachusetts Pirates
On May 17, 2018, Thomas signed with the Massachusetts Pirates of the National Arena League.

Washington Valor
Thomas was assigned to the Washington Valor in 2019, but he was placed on reassignment on April 19, 2019.

AFL career statistics

References

External links

 ESPN profile 
 Darron Thomas 
 GoDucks.com biography

Living people
1990 births
American football quarterbacks
Oregon Ducks football players
Calgary Stampeders players
Lincoln Haymakers players
Portland Thunder players
Portland Steel players
Players of American football from Houston
Arizona Rattlers players
Cedar Rapids River Kings players
Massachusetts Pirates players
Washington Valor players